Ploceus is a genus of birds in the weaver family, Ploceidae. They are native to the Indomalayan and Afrotropical realms.

Taxonomy and systematics

Phylogeny 
The genus Ploceus was introduced by the French naturalist Georges Cuvier in 1816. The type species was subsequently designated as the baya weaver. The genus name is from Ancient Greek πλοκευς plokeus meaning "weaver", and is derived from the Greek word πλεκω plekō "to entwine".

Based on recent DNA-analysis, the genus Ploceus is almost certainly polyphyletic. If all species currently included in the genus would remain and the genus would be made monophyletic, it would have to encompass the entire subfamily Ploceinae. The Ploceinae can be divided into two groups. In the first group, the widowbirds and bishops (genus Euplectes) are sister to a clade in which the genera Foudia and Quelea are closest relatives and which further includes the Asiatic species of Ploceus, i.e. P. manyar, P. philippinus, P. benghalensis, P. megarhynchus, (and P. hypoxanthus, although untested). Since Georges Cuvier picked P. philippinus as the type species, these five species would logically remain assigned to the genus Ploceus.

Basic to the second group is a clade consisting of both species so far included in Ploceus that live on Madagascar, P. nelicourvi and P. sakalava, and these are morphologically very distinct from the remaining species. These two species could in future be assigned to the genus Nelicurvius that was erected by Charles Lucien Bonaparte in 1850, but which was merged with Ploceus later on. This second group further contains the genera Malimbus and Anaplectes, and all remaining Ploceus species. As Malimbus is the earlier name, erected by Vieillot et al. in 1805, the remaining species of Ploceus, as well as Anaplectes rubiceps, could in future be assigned to Malimbus. These changes are largely corroborated by morphological revisions. Provided that the other genera that have not been proposed to be merged into an extended "Malimbus" are monophyletic, the following (incomplete) tree expresses current insights.

Species list

The genus contains 68 species.

References

External links

 
Ploceidae
Bird genera
Taxa named by Georges Cuvier